This article refers to the Park. For the gorge see Tallulah Gorge, for the town, see Tallulah Falls, Georgia, for the lake, see Lake Tallulah Falls and for the river, see Tallulah River.

Tallulah Gorge State Park is a  Georgia state park adjacent to Tallulah Falls, Georgia, along the county line between Rabun and Habersham Counties. The major attractions of the gorge are the six waterfalls known as the Tallulah Falls, which cause the river to drop 500 feet over one mile (150 m over 1.6 km).

History
Although Tallulah Gorge State Park was not established until 1993 under Georgia governor Zell Miller as a result of cooperation with Georgia Power, there were discussions as early as 1905 regarding the establishment of a park at Tallulah Gorge. Tourism intensified in 1882 with the completion of a railroad later called the Tallulah Falls Railroad which brought thousands of people a week to the area. Additionally, when Georgia Power began building a series of hydroelectric dams along the original course of the Tallulah River, efforts to establish a park intensified.  Helen Dortch Longstreet, widow of Confederate General James Longstreet, led an unsuccessful campaign in 1911 to have Tallulah Gorge protected by the state.

Area
Tallulah Gorge is bounded upstream by a hydroelectric dam operated by Georgia Power. Normally, the river flows much lower than the historical flow. Large releases of water are typically scheduled for kayaking and whitewater rafting on the first two weekends of April and the first three weekends of November. Additional aesthetic water releases are scheduled for weekends in the spring and fall to allow visitors to see what the natural flow of the river would look like in the gorge.

Facilities

50 tent, trailer, RV campsites
Backcountry Adirondack shelter 
Interpretive center and film
Gorge overlooks
Suspension bridge
 lake with beach (seasonal)
2 picnic shelters 
Tennis courts
Pioneer campground
Gift shop

Activities

Whitewater paddling – first 2 April weekends and first 3 November weekends
Aesthetic water releases (spring and fall)
Bicycling –  paved "Rails to Trails" path
Swimming
Rock Climbing
Fishing
Picnicking
Interpretive programs
playing

References

External links

Tallulah Gorge State Park
History of Tallulah Gorge State Park
Georgia parks

State parks of Georgia (U.S. state)
State parks of the Appalachians
Protected areas of Rabun County, Georgia
Protected areas established in 1993
1993 establishments in Georgia (U.S. state)